Sir John Maldwyn Thomas (17 June 1918 – 31 July 2002) was a Welsh businessman and Liberal Party politician.

Background
Maldwyn Thomas was the son of Daniel and Gwladys Thomas. He was educated at Porth Rhondda Grammar School. In 1975, he married Maureen Elizabeth Thomas. In 1984 he was knighted. In 1999 his wife Maureen received the DBE.

Professional career
Thomas was a Fellow of the Chartered Institute of Secretaries, he took first place in South Wales in both his intermediate and final examinations. He was secretary to Lewis & Tylor Ltd, a large industrial concern in Cardiff, from 1940-56. In 1953 he was Called to Bar at Gray's Inn. He worked for Rank Xerox from 1964-1979, as Secretary, Managing Director and finally as Chairman.

Political career
Thomas was Liberal candidate for the Aberavon division of Glamorgan at the 1950 General Election. It was not a promising seat for the Liberals who had not run a candidate since 1931. He came a third;

He did not stand for parliament again. He served as President of the Welsh Liberal Party from 1985–86. He was President of the London Welsh Association and Trust from 1994-2001. He was a Trustee of the London Welsh School.

References

1918 births
2002 deaths
Knights Bachelor
Liberal Party (UK) parliamentary candidates
Members of Gray's Inn
Politicians awarded knighthoods
Welsh barristers
Welsh politicians